Alexey Gavrilovich Venetsianov (18 February 1780–4 January 1847) was a Russian painter, renowned for his paintings devoted to peasant life and ordinary people.

Life

Alexey Venetsianov was born into a merchant family in Moscow. He entered the civil service in the early 19th century and moved to St. Petersburg, where he began to study art. He first practiced with pictures of the Hermitage and with portraits of friends. He later became acquainted with Vladimir Borovikovsky and lived in his house as an apprentice. He tried to work as a freelance portraitist, but received few commissions. In 1811 the Board of the Academy of Arts awarded him the title of Academician for his two works - Self-Portrait and Portrait of K. I. Golovachevsky and the Younger Pupils of the Academy.

In 1819, devoting himself purely to art, Venetsianov left the service, bought the village of Safonkovo, and settled there. During this time he painted scenes from nature that he observed around him. These works were of prime importance in his career. He painted portraits of peasants, and scenes illustrating rural life. He was the first to depict peasant life in Russian art. His works achieved great success at the exhibition of 1824, where he received critical praise.

Venetsianov wished to become a professor in the Academy of Arts, but the academicians did not grant him their approval, mainly because he lacked academic training. During the years prior to 1820 he began to attract young people from poor backgrounds, and even serfs such as Grigory Soroka, to teach them painting. By the middle of the 1820s he had a group of followers, and established his own school of painting. Tsar Nicholas I, who liked to promote ‘national trends’, expressed his approval for the artist and appointed him a court painter. This title gave him the financial support necessary for running the school, where tuition was practically free.
Venetsianov died in an accident in 1847 when his horses dashed off and his carriage fell down a steep slope.

Selected works

See also
 List of Russian artists
Students
Evgraf Krendovsky
Kapiton Zelentsov

External links

Venetsianov Biography

19th-century painters from the Russian Empire
Russian male painters
Russian people of Greek descent
Artists from Moscow
1780 births
1847 deaths
Court painters
19th-century male artists from the Russian Empire